The year 1997 is the first year in the history of M-1 Global, a mixed martial arts promotion based in Russia. In 1997 M-1 Global held 1 event, M-1 MFC: World Championship 1997.

Events list

M-1 MFC: World Championship 1997

M-1 MFC: World Championship 1997 was an event held on November 1, 1997, in Saint Petersburg, Russia.

Results

See also 
 M-1 Global

References

M-1 Global events
1997 in mixed martial arts